Land change science refers to the interdisciplinary study of changes in climate, land use, and land cover. Land change science specifically seeks to evaluate patterns, processes, and consequences in changes in land use and cover over time. The purpose of land change science is to contribute to existing knowledge of climate change and to the development of sustainable resource management and land use policy. The field is informed by a number of related disciplines, such as remote sensing, landscape ecology, and political ecology, and uses a broad range of methods to evaluate the patterns and processes that underlie land cover change. Land change science addresses land use as a coupled human-environment system to understand the impacts of interconnected environmental and social issues, including deforestation and urbanization.

History

Origin 
Human changes to land surfaces have been documented for centuries as having significant impacts on both earth systems and human well-being. The reshaping of landscapes to serve human needs, such as the deforestation for farmland, can have long-term effects on earth systems and exacerbate the causes of climate change. Although the burning of fossil fuels is the primary driver of present-day climate change, prior to the Industrial Revolution, deforestation and irrigation were the largest sources of human-driven greenhouse gas emissions. Even today, 35% of anthropogenic carbon dioxide contributions can be attributed to land use or land cover changes. Currently, almost 50% of Earth’s non-ice land surface has been transformed by human activities, with approximately 40% of that land used for agriculture, surpassing natural systems as the principal source of nitrogen emissions.Land change science is a recently developed field, which emerged in conjunction with the advancement of climate change and global environmental change research, and is important to the evolution of climate change science and adaptation. It is both problem-oriented and interdisciplinary. In the mid-20th century, human-environment relationships were emerging in areas of study such as anthropology and geography. Some scholars assert that the discipline of land change science is loosely derived from German concepts of landscape as the total amount of things within a given territory. In the latter half of the 20th century, scientists studying cultural ecology and risk-assessment ecology worked to develop land change science as a means of addressing land as a human-environment system that can be understood as a foundation of global environmental science.

Thus far, the purpose of land change science has been to:
 Observe and monitor land changes underway throughout the world
 Understand land change as a human-environmental system
 Model land change
 Assess system outcomes such as vulnerability, sustainability, and resilience

Influences 
Land change science is an interdisciplinary field, and thus is influenced by a number of related areas of study, including remote sensing, political ecology, resource economics, landscape ecology, and biogeography. It is meant to supplement the study of climate change, and through the examination of land cover and land use changes in conjunction with climatic changes over the same period of time, scientists can better understand how human land use practices contribute to a changing climate. Given its close association with the study of climate change, land change science is inherently sustainability research and the scientific knowledge it produces is used to influence the development of sustainable agriculture, and sustainable land use practices and policies.

Dimensions 
Land change science mainly operates within the international scientific research frameworks from which its fundamental questions were developed. Although the field has ties to social and cultural studies in its understanding of land and land change as a human-environment system, land change science also focuses on ecosystems and earth systems' structure, function, and effects on land change, independent of human activity. Land change science encompasses a broad scope of dimensions, ranging from quantifying the ecological effects of land cover change, to understanding the socio-environmental drivers for land-use decisions at an institutional level. As a result, land change science relies heavily on the synthesis of a wide range of data and a diverse range of data collection methods, some of which are detailed below.

Land cover monitoring and assessments 
A primary function of land change science is to document and model long-term patterns of landscape change, which may result from both human activity and natural processes. In the course of monitoring and assessing land cover and land use changes, scientists look at several factors, including where land-cover and land-use are changing, the extent and timescale of changes, and how changes vary through time. To this end, scientists use a variety of tools, including satellite imagery and other sources of remotely sensed data (e.g., aircraft imagery), field observations, historical accounts, and reconstruction modeling. These tools, particularly satellite imagery, allow land change scientists to accurately monitor land-change rates and create a consistent, long-term record to quantify change variability over time. Through observing patterns in land cover changes, scientists can determine the consequences of these changes, predict the impact of future changes, and use this information to inform strategic land management.

Aral Sea 
The rapid decline of the Aral Sea is an example how local-scale land use and land change can have compounded impacts on regional climate systems, particularly when human activities heavily disrupt natural climatic cycles, how land change science can be used to map and study such changes. In 1960, the Aral Sea, located in Central Asia, was the world's fourth largest lake. However, a water diversion project, undertaken by the Soviet Union to irrigate arid plains in what is now Kazakhstan, Uzbekistan, and Turkmenistan, resulted in the Aral Sea losing 85% of its land cover and 90% of its volume. The loss of the Aral Sea has had a significant effect on human-environment interactions in the region, including the decimation of the sea's fishing industry and the salinization of agricultural lands by the wind-spread of dried sea salt beds. Additionally, scientists have been able to use technology such as NASA's Moderate Resolution Imaging Spectroradiometer (MODIS) to track changes to the Aral Sea and its surrounding climate over time. This use of modeling and satellite imagery to track human-caused land cover change is characteristic of the scope of land change science.

Risk and vulnerability 
Modeling risk and vulnerability is also one of land change science's practical applications. Accurate predictions of how human activity will influence land cover change over time, as well as the impact that such changes have on the sustainability of ecological and human systems, can inform the creation of policy designed to address these changes.

Studying risk and vulnerability in the context of land change science entails the development of quantitative, qualitative, and geospatial models, methods, and support tools. The purpose of these tools is to communicate the vulnerability of both human communities and natural ecosystems to hazard events or long-term land change. Modeling risk and vulnerability requires analyses of community sensitivity to hazards, an understanding of geographic distributions of people and infrastructure, and accurate calculation of the probability of specific disturbances occurring.

Land change modeling 
A key method for studying risk and vulnerability in the context of land change science is land change modeling (LCM), which can be used to simulate changes and land use and land cover. LCMs can be used to predict how land use and land cover may change under alternate circumstances, which is useful for risk assessment, in that it allows for the prediction of potential impacts and can be used to inform policy decisions, albeit with some uncertainty.

Human impact and land change science 
Although land change science involves quantifying the location, extent, and variability of land change cover and the analysis of emergent patterns, it remains fundamentally interdisciplinary, including social and economic components. Human activity is not only the most significant cause of land cover change, but humans are also directly impacted by the environmental consequences of these changes. Collective land use and land cover changes have fundamentally altered the functioning of key Earth systems. For instance, human changes to land use and land cover have a profound impact climate at a local and regional level, which in turn contributes to global warming. More generally, maximizing natural resources and ecosystem services for short-term benefits often hinders the long-term resilience of ecosystems  and in turn, their ability to support human needs. 

Given the important role that humans play in land cover change, and to understand land change patterns and their affect the climate, land change scientists must identify the social and economic drivers of historic land change. Below are some examples of land use and land cover change that play a key role in the social and economic dimensions of land change science.

Tropical deforestation 

Deforestation, in the context of land change science, is the systematic and permanent conversion of previously forested land for other uses. It has historically been a primary facilitator of land use and land cover change, is a particular focus of land change science. Forests are a vital part of the global ecosystem and are essential to carbon capture, ecological processes, and biodiversity. However, since the invention of agriculture, global forest cover has diminished by 35%. Further, tropical forests in particular support at least two-thirds of the world's biodiversity, and sustained changes in land cover in these regions are believed to be contributing to a mass extinction. Given the severe ecological consequences resulting from human-driven forest land use conversion, as well as the continuing downward trend in forest cover, to effectively model and evaluate patterns of land use change, scientists must also study the social and economic drivers of deforestation itself.

Land use and land cover change resulting from deforestation is primarily the effect of large-scale socio-economic processes. Importantly, there is rarely one direct or underlying cause for deforestation. Rather, deforestation is the result of intertwining systemic forces working simultaneously or sequentially to change land cover. For instance, mass deforestation is often viewed as the product of industrial agriculture, yet a considerable portion old-growth forest deforestation is the result of small-scale migrant farming. As forest cover is removed, forest resources become exhausted and increasing populations lead to scarcity, which prompts people to move again to previously undisturbed forest, restarting the process of deforestation. This process is referred to as rural-to-rural migration. There are several reasons behind this continued migration: poverty-driven lack of available farmland and high costs may lead to an increase in farming intensity on existing farmland. This leads to the overexploitation of farmland, and down the line results in desertification, another land cover change, which renders soil unusable and unprofitable, requiring farmers to seek out untouched and unpopulated old-growth forests. 

In addition to rural migration and subsistence farming, economic development can also play a substantial role in deforestation. For example, road and railway expansions designed to increase quality of life have resulted in significant deforestation in the Amazon and Central America. Moreover, the underlying drivers of economic development are often linked to global economic engagement, instead of to poverty, ranging from increased exports to a foreign debt. Deforestation occurs for many interconnected reasons, and thus it is important for land change scientists to track it in order to identify patterns that can shed light on why and when it happens. Phenomena such as economic insecurity and rural migration are not necessarily quantitative, but they nevertheless provide valuable information to land change science models that attempt to predict future land cover change and its consequences.

Urbanization 

Broadly, urbanization is the increasing number of people who live in urban areas. In the context of land change science, urbanization refers to both urban population growth and the physical growth of urban areas. According to the United Nations, the global urban population has increased rapidly since 1950, from 751 million to 4.2 billion in 2018, and current trends predict this number will continue to grow. Accompanying this population shift are significant changes in economic flow, culture and lifestyle, and spatial population distribution. Although urbanized areas cover just 3% of the Earth's surface, they nevertheless have a significant impact on land use and land cover change.  

Urbanization is important to land use and land cover change, and therefore land change science, for a variety of reasons. In particular, urbanization affects land change elsewhere through the shifting of urban-rural linkages, or the ecological footprint of the transfer of goods and services between urban and rural areas. Increases in urbanization lead to increases in consumption, which puts increased pressure on surrounding rural lands. The outward spread of urban areas can also take over adjacent land formerly used for crop cultivation.

Urban heat islands 
Urbanization additionally affects land cover through the urban heat island effect. Heat islands occur when, due to high concentrations of structures, such as buildings and roads, that absorb and re-emit solar radiation, and low concentrations of vegetative cover, urban areas experience higher temperatures than surrounding areas. Heat islands can cause increased energy consumption, which results in higher rates of emission for greenhouse gases. The high temperatures associated with heat islands can also compromise human health, particularly in low-income areas. The effects of urban areas on climate indicate that urbanization may become a significant component of land change science.

Obstacles 
Land change science as a discipline faces several challenges, many of the stemming from its interdisciplinary qualities or issues with developing inferences using aggregate data. For example, land change science is limited by constraints on data and lack of understanding of underlying issues of land change. Specifically, the spatial models frequently used to study land change may restricted by lack of access to public data on land change, faulty sensors, and high levels of variable uncertainty. Thus, models are often only able to make short-term projections, which severely limits the level of prediction they can provide. Additionally, it is difficult to synthesize and combine the case studies of social-environmental systems that are essential to the study of land change on a global scale. Thus, these setbacks pose fundamental challenges to the connection of communities and environment that land change science seeks to achieve.

See also 
 Climate Change Science Program

References

Earth sciences
Human impact on the environment